Planorbis is a genus of air-breathing freshwater snails, aquatic pulmonate gastropod mollusks in the family Planorbidae, the ram's horn snails, or planorbids. All species in this genus have sinistral or left-coiling shells.

Description 
Planorbis shells are flat-coiled and sinistral.

Distribution 
This genus has a worldwide distribution. It is known from the Jurassic to the Recent periods.

Species
Species within the genus Planorbis include:
Subgenus Planorbis (Jalpuchorbis) Prysjazhnjuk & Kovalenko, 1986
 † Planorbis bolgradensis Prysjazhnjuk & Kovalenko, 1986 
 † Planorbis roshkai Prysjazhnjuk & Kovalenko, 1986
 Subgenus Planorbis (Planorbis) Müller, 1773
 Planorbis corinna Gray, 1850
 Planorbis carinatus O. F. Müller, 1774
 Planorbis moquini Requien, 1848
 Planorbis planorbis (Linnaeus, 1758)
 Planorbis kahuica Finlay & Laws, 1931
Subgenus ?
 † Planorbis anceps Sacco, 1884 
 † Planorbis austroalpinus Harzhauser & Neubauer in Harzhauser et al., 2012 
 † Planorbis bouei Pavlović, 1932 
 † Planorbis fischeri Wenz, 1919 
 † Planorbis gladilini Pavlović, 1931 
  Planorbis intermixtus Mousson, 1874
 † Planorbis kochi Pavlović, 1927 
 † Planorbis nisseanus Pavlović, 1931 
 † Planorbis petrovici Pavlović, 1931 
 † Planorbis striatus Serres, 1853 
 † Planorbis truncatocarinatus Pavlović, 1931 
 † Planorbis verticilloides Pavlović, 1931 
 † Planorbis zivkovici Pavlović, 1931 
Suggenera and species brought into synonymy 
 Subgenus Planorbis (Anisus) Studer, 1820: synonym of Anisus Studer, 1820
 Subgenus Planorbis (Armiger) Hartmann, 1843 : synonym of Gyraulus (Armiger) Hartmann, 1843 represented as Gyraulus Charpentier, 1837
 Subgenus Planorbis (Bathyomphalus) Charpentier, 1837: synonym of Bathyomphalus Charpentier, 1837
 Subgenus Planorbis (Coretus) Gray, 1847: synonym of Planorbarius Duméril, 1805
 Subgenus Planorbis (Gyraulus) Agassiz in Charpentier, 1837: synonym of Gyraulus Charpentier, 1837
 † Planorbis (Gyraulus) declivis var. balizacensis Peyrot, 1932: synonym of † Anisus balizacensis (Peyrot, 1932) 
 Subgenus Planorbis (Gyrorbis) Fitzinger, 1833: synonym of Valvata O. F. Müller, 1774
 Subgenus Planorbis (Odontogyrorbis) Lörenthey, 1906: synonym of Anisus (Anisus) Studer, 1820
 Subgenus Planorbis (Segmentina) Fleming, 1818: synonym of Segmentina Fleming, 1818
 Planorbis acronicus Férussac, 1807: synonym of Gyraulus acronicus (Férussac, 1807)
 Planorbis albus O. F. Müller, 1774: synonym of Gyraulus albus (O. F. Müller, 1774)
 Planorbis argaeicus Sturany, 1904: synonym of Gyraulus argaeicus (Sturany, 1904)
 Planorbis atkinsoni Johnston, 1879: synonym of Gyraulus atkinsoni (Johnston, 1879)
 Planorbis biwaensis Preston, 1916: synonym of Gyraulus biwaensis (Preston, 1916)
 Planorbis borealis Westerlund, 1875: synonym of Gyraulus borealis (Lovén in Westerlund, 1875) 
 Planorbis campanulatus Say, 1821 accepted as Planorbella campanulata (Say, 1821)
 Planorbis chinensis Dunker, 1848: synonym of Gyraulus chinensis (Dunker, 1848)
 Planorbis contrarius O. F. Müller, 1774: synonym of Marisa cornuarietis (Linnaeus, 1758)
 Planorbis convexiusculus Hutton, 1849: synonym of Gyraulus convexiusculus (Hutton, 1849)
 Planorbis costulatus Krauss, 1848: synonym of Gyraulus costulatus (Krauss, 1848)
 Planorbis crosseanus Bourguignat, 1862: synonym of Gyraulus albus (O. F. Müller, 1774)
 Planorbis ehrenbergi Beck, 1837: synonym of Gyraulus ehrenbergi (Beck, 1837)
 Planorbis essingtonensis E. A. Smith, 1882: synonym of Gyraulus essingtonensis (E. A. Smith, 1882)
 Planorbis fragilis Tate, 1896: synonym of Gyraulus essingtonensis (E. A. Smith, 1882)
 Planorbis gredleri Gredler, 1859: synonym of Gyraulus acronicus (Férussac, 1807)
 Planorbis hebraicus Bourguignat, 1852: synonym of Gyraulus hebraicus (Bourguignat, 1852)
 Planorbis hispidus Draparnaud, 1805: synonym of Gyraulus albus (O. F. Müller, 1774)
 Planorbis imbricatus O. F. Müller, 1774: synonym of Gyraulus crista (Linnaeus, 1758) represented as Gyraulus (Armiger) crista (Linnaeus, 1758)
 Planorbis laevis Alder, 1838: synonym of Gyraulus laevis (Alder, 1838)
 Planorbis leucostoma Millet, 1813: synonym of Anisus (Anisus) leucostoma (Millet, 1813)
 Planorbis natalensis Krauss, 1848: synonym of Afrogyrorbis natalensis (Krauss, 1848)
 Planorbis paladilhi Moitessier, 1867: synonym of Gyraulus crista (Linnaeus, 1758) represented as Gyraulus (Armiger) crista (Linnaeus, 1758)
 Planorbis parvus Say, 1817: synonym of Gyraulus parvus (Say, 1817)
 Planorbis persicus Ancey, 1900: synonym of Planorbis intermixtus Mousson, 1874
 Planorbis piscinarum Bourguignat, 1852: synonym of Gyraulus piscinarum (Bourguignat, 1852)
 Planorbis riparius Westerlund, 1865: synonym of Gyraulus riparius (Westerlund, 1865)
 Planorbis rossmaessleri Auerswald, 1851: synonym of Gyraulus rossmaessleri (Auerswald, 1851)
 Planorbis rotula Benson, 1850: synonym of Gyraulus rotula (Benson, 1850)
 Planorbis sivalensis Clessin, 1884: synonym of Gyraulus sivalensis (Clessin, 1884)
 Planorbis spirillus Gould, 1859: synonym of Gyraulus spirillus (Gould, 1859)
 Planorbis spirorbis (Linnaeus, 1758): synonym of Anisus (Anisus) spirorbis (Linnaeus, 1758)
 Planorbis thermalis Westerlund, 1885: synonym of Gyraulus laevis (Alder, 1838)
 Planorbis umbilicatus (Müller, 1773): synonym of Planorbis (Planorbis) planorbis (Linnaeus, 1758)
 Planorbis waterhousei Clessin, 1885: synonym of Gyraulus waterhousei (Clessin, 1885)

References

Further reading 
 Powell A. W. B. (1979). New Zealand Mollusca, William Collins Publishers Ltd, Auckland, New Zealand, 

Planorbidae
Jurassic gastropods
Cretaceous gastropods
Paleocene gastropods
Eocene gastropods
Oligocene gastropods
Miocene gastropods
Pliocene gastropods
Pleistocene gastropods